Francis Banecki (born 17 July 1985) is a German former professional footballer who mostly played as a defender.

Club career
Banecki played for Reinickendorfer Füchse and for Hertha BSC in his youth years.

In 2003–04, he moved to Werder Bremen youth system. After having had a successful 2004–05 season, he moved from Bremen's youth team to the first team in 2005–06.

After the 2006–07 season Banecki was loaned to Eintracht Braunschweig for one year. In Braunschweig he played nine times for the first team until a severe injury in his knee stopped him for over one year.

After the convalescence his contract with Werder Bremen expired, Banecki returned to Hertha BSC to play for the club's second team for the season 2008–09. On 5 August 2009, he left Hertha BSC II for Kickers Emden, but in December 2009 he resigned his contract with the club. He left Emden on 26 December 2009 and signed on 1 January 2010 for FC Oberneuland. In June 2010 he signed a contract with VfB Oldenburg but cancelled it after one month and signed with local rival SV Meppen.

International career
Banecki played six times for the German Under-20 team, scoring one goal and two times for the German Under-19 team.

Personal life
Banecki's siblings, the twins Nicole and Sylvie also played in the first Bundesliga. His mother's cousin, Marcel Mahouvé, represented Cameroon in the 1998 FIFA World Cup.

References

External links
 
 

1985 births
Living people
Footballers from Berlin
German footballers
Germany youth international footballers
Association football defenders
Bundesliga players
2. Bundesliga players
Füchse Berlin Reinickendorf players
Hertha BSC II players
SV Werder Bremen players
SV Werder Bremen II players
Eintracht Braunschweig players
Eintracht Braunschweig II players
German people of Cameroonian descent
Kickers Emden players
FC Oberneuland players
SV Meppen players
VfB Oldenburg players
VSG Altglienicke players